Suelta may refer to:

Salsa suelta, a syle of Salsa dancing
Comedia suelta, a practice of printing of plays in separate editions
Suelta, a song title in:
Contra la Corriente (Noriega album)
Haciendo Escante, Nicky Jam album